The Entertainment and Arts is an EP by Lifter Puller. It was released in 1998 and recorded with Eric Olsen and Dave Gardner at Burr Holland Studio in MPLS.

Track listing
Plymouth Rock (0:49)
The Candy Machine And My Girlfriend (2:51)
Sangre de Stephanie (5:26)
Roaming The Foam (3:02)
Star Wars Hips (4:06)
Let's Get Incredible (4:59)
Lifter_Puller_The Entertainment and Arts Pitchfork review

Lifter Puller albums
1998 EPs